Mohammad Inamullah (born 26 June 1996) is an Afghan cricketer. He made his first-class debut for Band-e-Amir Region in the 2017–18 Ahmad Shah Abdali 4-day Tournament on 1 December 2017. He made his List A debut for Kabul Region in the 2018 Ghazi Amanullah Khan Regional One Day Tournament on 15 July 2018.

References

External links
 

1996 births
Living people
Afghan cricketers
Band-e-Amir Dragons cricketers
Kabul Eagles cricketers
Place of birth missing (living people)